Anthony Urban Blount (born November 5, 1958) is a former American football defensive back. He played for the New York Giants in 1980.

References

1958 births
Living people
American football defensive backs
Virginia Cavaliers football players
New York Giants players